Łukowica  is a village in Limanowa County, Lesser Poland Voivodeship, in southern Poland. It is the seat of the gmina (administrative district) called Gmina Łukowica.

The village has a population of 2,220.

It is the birthplace of Michael Sendivogius (1566–1636), a Polish alchemist, philosopher, and medical doctor.

References

Villages in Limanowa County